Yehor Bozhok (born September 6, 1980) is a Ukrainian career diplomat and former chairman of the SZRU, the Foreign Intelligence Service of Ukraine. In this position he was a member of the National Security and Defense Council of Ukraine. He was acting head of the mission of Ukraine to NATO from June 2015 until his appointment as SZRU head.

He was born in Kyiv. Speaks English, French, Ukrainian and Russian.

Biography
In 2000 Bozhok graduated master's degree Program in European Politics at the Free University of Brussels. In 2002 graduated from the Institute of International Relations of Taras Shevchenko National University of Kyiv.

Starting in 2002, Bozhok occupied various positions within the Ukrainian Foreign Ministry.

2002-2005 – specialist (expert), attache, 3rd Secretary of the Armed Forces Department of the Ministry of Foreign Affairs of Ukraine;

2005-2009 – 3rd, 2nd Secretary for Political Affairs of Mission of Ukraine to NATO in Brussels;

2009-2010 – 1st Secretary of the NATO Department of the Ministry of Foreign Affairs of Ukraine;

2010-2013 – Head of the Division of Justice of the European Union Department of the Ministry of Foreign Affairs of Ukraine.

From June 2015 until his Foreign Intelligence Service appointment, Bozhok was acting head of Ukraine's NATO mission.

On 13 September 2017, President Petro Poroshenko signed a decree appointing Bozhok head of the Foreign Intelligence Service of Ukraine (SZRU). On 14 March 2019 President Poroshenko dismissed Bozhok as head of the Foreign Intelligence Service. The same day he was appointed Deputy Minister of Foreign Affairs.

References

1980 births
Living people
Diplomats from Kyiv
Taras Shevchenko National University of Kyiv, Institute of International Relations alumni
Ukrainian spies
Heads of mission of Ukraine to NATO
People of the Foreign Intelligence Service of Ukraine
People of the Chief Directorate of Intelligence (Ukraine)
Recipients of the Honorary Diploma of the Cabinet of Ministers of Ukraine